Rights of the Terminally Ill Act may refer to:
Rights of the Terminally Ill Act 1995, briefly legalising euthanasia in Australia's Northern Territory
Uniform Rights of the Terminally Ill Act, dealing with withholding of life support in the United States